Margaret Wynne Nevinson (née Jones) (11 January 1858 – 8 June 1932) was a British suffrage campaigner.

Nevinson was one of the suffragettes who split from the Women's Social and Political Union (WSPU) in 1907 to form the Women's Freedom League (WFL).  She wrote many articles for the WFL journal, The Vote, and also wrote many suffrage pamphlets including A History of the Suffrage Movement: 1908-1912, Ancient Suffragettes and The Spoilt Child and the Law. Nevinson was also the first woman Justice of the Peace in London as well as serving as a Poor Law Guardian.

Early life

Nevinson was born Margaret Wynne Jones at Vicarage House, Lower Church Gate, Leicester, on 11 January 1858, the daughter of the Revd Timothy Jones (c.1813–1873/4) and his wife, Mary Louisa (c.1830–1888). Her father, vicar of St Margaret's Church, Leicester, was a classical scholar who taught her Latin and Greek alongside her five brothers. Her mother had more traditional notions of appropriate pursuits for her only daughter. A brief, unhappy spell in an Oxford Anglican convent school was followed by finishing school in Paris.

The unexpected death of her father increased Margaret's wish to live independently. She tried governessing, then went to Cologne as a pupil teacher in a professor's family. In the early 1880s she became a classics mistress at South Hampstead High School, London. She also studied for examinations in Education, German, and Latin, becoming one of 63 women who gained the title and diploma of Lady Literate in Arts in 1882 from St Andrews University. Between 1882-3 she took a further course of lectures in English given by Henry Morley at University College London.

Marriage 

On 18 April 1884 in London Margaret married childhood friend, the journalist Henry Woodd Nevinson (1856–1941). They spent a year in Germany, Henry studying at University of Jena while Margaret resumed teaching English. Their daughter (Mary) Philippa, who became a talented musician, was born in Germany. After returning to London (encouraged by Samuel and Henrietta Barnett) they moved to workmen's flats in Whitechapel. Margaret taught French evening classes at Toynbee Hall and helped with St Jude's Girls' Club. She then became a rent collector in artisans' dwellings.

In 1887 the Nevinsons moved to Hampstead. Their son, born in August 1889, was the artist Christopher Richard Wynne Nevinson. His autobiography describes growing up as part of the Hampstead intelligentsia. His mother was "always a pioneer", from her shingled hair and hatred of lace curtains to her espousal of modern art, European outlook, and commitment to social justice (C. R. W. Nevinson, 6).

In 1901 the Nevinsons bought a house in Downside Crescent, Haverstock Hill, where Margaret lived for the rest of her life. By now Margaret and Henry's lives were running along separate grooves, not least because of the latter's night newspaper work. Henry also became a war correspondent so was frequently away for months. The marriage suffered though they never formally separated.

Employment and activism 

Margaret was a school manager for 25 years, initially for the London School Board in the East End, then for London County Council (north St Pancras).

In 1904 she became a Hampstead poor-law guardian, determined to root out inefficiency and expose anomalies, particularly where they affected poor women. Her greatest contribution was probably not so much through the weekly meetings she attended so regularly as in publicizing the problems of the poor law. She did this through talks to women's suffrage groups, articles, and stories. In 1918 she published twenty-six tales known as Workhouse Characters. These included one story which had earlier been turned into a one-act play called In the Workhouse. Gender-specific legislation discriminating against married women was increasingly the focus of Margaret's writings whether through pamphlets such as The Legal Wrongs of Women (Women's Freedom League, 1923) or via her thinly disguised autobiographical stories, Fragments of Life (1922).

An early trainee in massage, Margaret treated wounded Belgian soldiers during World War I. Although she had refused to speak on behalf of parties or causes other than suffrage prior to gaining the vote, once enfranchised she supported the Liberal Party. She also lectured on the League of Nations and became a vice-president of the Women's Peace Crusade. In 1927 she was elected to the committee of the Society of Women Journalists.

Her most significant post-war public service was, however, as a pioneer female justice of the peace. Nominated by the WFL, in June 1920 she became the first woman in London to adjudicate at criminal petty sessions. With her experience and self-confessed 'passion for justice' and "devotion to logic" (M. W. Nevinson, 254), she again played a crucial role in Hampstead's affairs. She also visited the United States to study the American probationary system. In 1921 she was one of three women appointed to the Lord Chancellor's London county justices advisory committee.

In the Workhouse (1911) 

Performed in 1911 in the Kingsway Theatre, In the Workhouse was one of the most controversial plays produced by Edy Craig's Pioneer Players as part of a triple bill with Chris St. John's The First Actress and Cicely Hamilton's Jack and Jill and A Friend (King's Hall, 1911). It is an exposé of the iniquities of the Coverture Act, which decreed that a married woman had no separate legal existence from her husband and therefore meant that if her husband entered - or left - the workhouse, she and her children were obliged to go with him.

Set in a workhouse ward, where a group of mothers, married and unmarried, look after their children, it exposes the contradictions of a system where Penelope, a respectable, secure, mother of five and unmarried is freer than respectable Mrs Cleaver who returns from her appeal to the Board of Guardians to announce that legally she has no right to leave the workhouse, even though she has work to go to and a home available for herself and her children.

The play, with its refusal to condemn vice and the unmarried mother, was either condemned for offensiveness or acclaimed for its importance. The Pall Mall Gazette  compared it to the work of Eugène Brieux "which plead for reform by painting a terrible, and perhaps overcharged, picture of things as they are... Such is the power of the dramatic pamphlet, sincerely written and sincerely acted. There is nothing to approach it in directness and force. It sweeps all mere prettiness into oblivion."

Two years after the play was produced, the law was changed in large measure due to Margaret's and other suffragists' campaigns.

The play was revived in 1979 by Mrs Worthington's Daughters, a feminist theatre company, directed by Julie Holledge in a double-bill with Susannah Cibber's The Oracle (1752).

Role in the suffrage movement 

Margaret joined a number of women's suffrage groups including the WSPU. A committed Christian, she was a member of the Church League for Women's Suffrage, spoke for the Cymric Suffrage Union (her father, originally from Lampeter, was a Welsh speaker) and was treasurer of the Women Writers' Suffrage League. Her main commitment was, however, to the Women's Freedom League (WFL). She was a founder member in 1907, became treasurer of the Hampstead branch and was widely known as a witty speaker with a good stock of stories. She frequently invoked classical and biblical themes to illustrate points. She participated in passive resistance such as the suffrage picket outside parliament, and refusing to pay taxes. Margaret also published pamphlets through the Women's Freedom League including Ancient Suffragettes (1911) and Five Year's Struggle for Freedom: a History of the Suffrage Movement (1908-1912).

Margaret's husband was also active in the suffrage movement, becoming a founder of the Men's Political Union for Women's Enfranchisement for which he wrote at least one dramatic sketch.

Final years and death 

Margaret's autobiography was published in 1926. Her final years were lonely ones, plagued by depression. She died of kidney failure at her Hampstead home, 4 Downside Crescent, on 8 June 1932. She was buried on 11 June at St Stephen's Church, Rosslyn Hill, London.

After Margaret's death her husband remarried, to her close friend and prominent suffragist, Evelyn Sharp.

See also
List of suffragists and suffragettes
Women's Freedom League

References

External links
Spartacus article on Margaret Nevinson
 
 
 

1858 births
1932 deaths
British suffragists
English tax resisters
Women of the Victorian era